Don't Listen Ladies is a 1963 Australian TV movie. It starred Margo Lee and was directed by James Upshaw.

Plot
In a French antique shop, Daniel and his second wife Madeleine have marital adventures. She finds a letter that makes her think he is having an affair. She encourages the love of Daniel's assistant, Blandinet. Also involved are Daniel's first wife Valentine, a former girlfriend called Julie, a young man called Michel who Madeleine thinks of marrying, and a customer Baron de Charancy.

Cast
Alex Archdale as Daniel Archelete
Margot Lee as Madeleine
Neva Carr Glynn as Julie
Noel Brophy as Baron
Neil Fitzpatrick as Blandinet
Owen Weingott as Michel
Audrey Teasdale
Ronald Morse

Reception
The Bulletin called it "harmless, tolerable entertainment."

The Sydney Morning Herald praised Archdale's performance.

See also
List of television plays broadcast on Australian Broadcasting Corporation (1960s)

References

External links

1960s Australian television plays
1963 television films
Australian Broadcasting Corporation original programming
English-language television shows
Australian live television shows
Black-and-white Australian television shows
1963 films
1960s English-language films